Sclerophrys kisoloensis is a species of toad in the family Bufonidae. It is found in southwestern Kenya, Uganda, Rwanda, eastern Democratic Republic of the Congo, northeastern Zambia, western Tanzania, and (pending confirmation) northern Malawi. It probably also occurs in Burundi. Common names Kisolo toad and montane golden toad have been coined for it.

Breeding takes place in pools and slow streams. It is a rarely encountered species in most of its range. It can be threatened by habitat loss caused particularly by agriculture and wood extraction.

References

kisoloensis
Frogs of Africa
Amphibians of the Democratic Republic of the Congo
Amphibians of Kenya
Amphibians of Malawi
Amphibians of Rwanda
Amphibians of Tanzania
Amphibians of Uganda
Taxa named by Arthur Loveridge
Amphibians described in 1932
Taxonomy articles created by Polbot